The 83rd running of the Tour of Flanders cycling race in Belgium was held on Sunday 4 April 1999. It was the second leg of the UCI Road World Cup. Belgian Peter Van Petegem won his first victory in the monument classic. The race started in Bruges and finished in Meerbeke (Ninove).

Race summary
Frank Vandenbroucke attacked 150 from the finish with his Cofidis team, but he crashed on the Molenberg and his team mate Philippe Gaumont crashed on the Paddestraat, causing the pack to catch them again on the Oude Kwaremont. Michele Bartoli and Vandenbroucke tried to break clear on the Paterberg and Leberg, but were given little space. A group of eleven was at the foot of the Muur van Geraardsbergen, when Vandenbroucke crashed again, causing everyone to halt except for Peter Van Petegem and Johan Museeuw. Van Petegem and Museeuw continued to work together and only Frank Vandenbroucke, the strongest man in the race, managed to bridge the gap on the Bosberg. Van Petegem tried to break clear in the final kilometer, but Vandenbroucke caught him again. Van Petegem beat Vandenbroucke and Museeuw in a three-man sprint, leading to the first completely Belgian podium in 17 years.

Climbs
There were sixteen categorized climbs:

Results

External links
 Recap of the race (Flemish television)

References

Tour of Flanders
Tour of Flanders
Tour of Flanders
Tour Of Flanders
April 1999 sports events in Europe